"Summer of '81" is a song by Australian rock band Mondo Rock, released in October 1981. It is the fourth and final single to be released from the band's second studio album Chemistry (1981). It peaked at number 31 on the Kent Music Report.

Track listing 
 "Summer of '81" (Eric McCusker) - 3:56
 "Mona Lisa (She Smiles)" (E. McCusker) - 4:06
 "The Fugitive Kind" (live in concert) - 3:47

Charts

References 

1981 singles
1981 songs
Mondo Rock songs